The Hohe Geige is the highest mountain in the Geigenkamm group of the Ötztal Alps.

See also
 List of mountains of the Alps

External links
 "Hohe Geige" on Summitpost

Mountains of Tyrol (state)
Mountains of the Alps
Alpine three-thousanders
Ötztal Alps